Grammodes pulcherrima, the comely box-owlet, is a moth of the family Noctuidae first described by Thomas Pennington Lucas in 1892. It is found in the northern half of Australia.

References

Ophiusina
Moths of New Zealand
Moths described in 1892